Flower of Evil is a South Korean television series starring Lee Joon-gi, Moon Chae-won, Jang Hee-jin, and Seo Hyun-woo. It aired on tvN every Wednesday and Thursday from July 29 to September 23, 2020, and streamed internationally on Netflix,  iQIYI, Viki and ViuTV with multi-languages subtitles. Lee and Moon have previously starred in Criminal Minds, and it was Lee's return to television after two years.

Synopsis
Baek Hee-sung (Lee Joon-gi) is a man who hides his identity and past from his wife Cha Ji-won (Moon Chae-won), a detective. On the surface, they appear to be the perfect family: A loving couple with a beautiful six-year-old daughter who adores her parents. 

Cha Ji-won and her colleagues begin investigating a series of unexplained murders and is confronted with the reality that her seemingly perfect husband may be hiding something from her.

Cast

Main
 Lee Joon-gi as Baek Hee-sung / Do Hyun-soo
 Park Hyun-joon as young Hyun-soo
 Cha Sung-je as child Hyun-soo
 Moon Chae-won as Cha Ji-won, Hee-sung/Hyun-soo's wife
 Jang Hee-jin as Do Hae-soo
Lim Na-young as teenage Hae-soo, Hyun-soo's older sister
 Lee Chae-yoon as eleven-year-old Hae-soo
 Seo Hyun-woo as Kim Moo-jin, journalist
 Jeong Taek-hyun as young Moo-jin

Supporting

Baek Hee-sung and Cha Ji-won's family 
 Jung Seo-yeon as Baek Eun-ha, daughter of Hee-sung and Ji-won
 Son Jong-hak as Baek Man-woo, Hee-sung's father
 Nam Gi-ae as Gong Mi-ja, Hee-sung's mother
 Jo Kyung-sook as Moon Young-ok, Ji-won's mother

Kangsoo Police Station 
 Choi Dae-hoon as Lee Woo-cheol, leader of Homicide Investigation Team
 Choi Young-joon as Choi Jae-sub, veteran detective
 Kim Soo Oh as Im Ho-joon, youngest team member
 Lim Chul-hyung as Yoon Sang-pil, section chief
 Hong Seo-joon as Oh Young-joon, police captain

Hanjoogan Magazine 
 Yang Hye-jin as Gang Pil-young, lead reporter
 Ju Ye-eun as Reporter Joo

Extended 
Choi Byung-mo as Do Min-seok, father of Hae-soo and Hyun-soo
Kim Ji-hoon as Baek Hee-sung
Choi Kwon-soo as young Hee-sung
Lee Kyu-bok as Nam Soon-gil
Kim Geon as Kim In-seo
Lee Ju-yeon as Park Seo-young
Han Soo-yeon as Jung Mi-sook
Yoon Byung-hee as Park Kyung-choon, taxi driver and husband of Jung Mi-sook
Park Seung-tae as Oh Bok-ja
Kim Ki-cheon as Dr. Lee Hyun-suk

Original soundtrack

Part 1

Part 2

Part 3

Viewership

Awards and nominations

Adaptation
On September 16, 2021, ABS-CBN announced a Philippine remake for the series. It was released on Viu on June 23, 2022, along with its television broadcast on Kapamilya Channel and A2Z which premiered on June 25, 2022.

Duranga is the Hindi remake produced by Rose Audio Visuals with streaming partner ZEE5 after buying rights from Studio Dragon. The show was released on August 18, 2022. It is also the first official remake of a Korean drama in India.

References

External links
  
 Flower of Evil at Studio Dragon 
 Flower of Evil at Monster Union 
 
 

TVN (South Korean TV channel) television dramas
Korean-language television shows
2020 South Korean television series debuts
2020 South Korean television series endings
South Korean melodrama television series
Television series by Studio Dragon
Television series by Monster Union
Television productions suspended due to the COVID-19 pandemic